A duction is an eye movement involving only one eye. There are generally six possible movements depending upon the eye's axis of rotation:
Abduction refers to the outward movement of an eye.
Adduction refers to the inward movement of an eye
Supraduction / sursumduction / elevation
Infraduction / deosumduction / depression
Incycloduction / intorsion
Excycloduction / extorsion

Forced duction test 

The forced duction test is performed in order to determine whether the absence of movement of the eye is due to a neurological disorder or a mechanical restriction.

The anesthetized conjunctiva is grasped with forceps and an attempt is made to move the eyeball in the direction where the movement is restricted. If a mechanical restriction is present, it will not be possible to induce a passive movement of the eyeball.

Notes

See also
Extraocular muscles
Eye examination
Vergence
Version (eye)

Eye
Ophthalmology